Indonesian author Chairil Anwar (1922–1949) wrote 75 poems, 7 pieces of prose, and 3 poetry collections. He also translated 10 poems and 4 pieces of prose. The majority of Anwar's original poems are included in his collections: Deru Campur Debu, Kerikil-Kerikil Tajam dan yang Terampas dan yang Putus (both 1949), and Tiga Menguak Takdir (1950). In 1956 documentarian HB Jassin compiled most of Anwar's remaining works as Chairil Anwar: Pelopor Angkatan 45, and in 1970 Burton Raffel published English translations of Anwar's original works as The Complete Poetry and Prose of Chairil Anwar.

Born in Medan, North Sumatra, Anwar studied at schools run by the Dutch colonial government until around 1940, when he and his mother moved to the capital, Batavia (now Jakarta). There he began immersing himself within the local literary scene. In 1942 he wrote "Nisan" ("Gravestone"), which is generally considered his first poem. He wrote extensively during the Japanese occupation (1942–1945), at times having to change his poems to avoid censorship; for instance, the title of his best-known work, "Aku" ("Me"), was temporarily known as "Semangat" ("Spirit") to avoid censorship based on themes of individuality. Anwar possessed a passionate individualism, and the line "I want to live another thousand years" from "Aku" is often quoted. As the years passed, this individualism developed into a feeling of mortality and surrender; ultimately it is difficult, if not impossible, to identify a single theme which unites all of Anwar's work. A notorious womaniser, he died at age 27; several sources suggest syphilis as the cause of his death.

After his death Anwar was criticised for plagiarism, with several works revealed to have been uncredited translations of foreign poems. His original works, unlike poems by earlier writers, used everyday language in an unusual manner in his poetry, mixing in words from foreign languages. Anwar's poems were also multi-interpretable. As such, the criticism of his plagiarism – although extensive at the time of discovery – has not affected his legacy. The Dutch scholar of Indonesian literature A. Teeuw described Anwar as "the perfect poet", while Raffel describes him as "Indonesia's greatest literary figure". The anniversary of his death, 28 April, is celebrated as National Poetry Day.

The following list is divided into five tables based on the type of works contained within. The tables are initially arranged alphabetically by title, although they are also sortable. Titles, originally in the Van Ophuijsen and Republican spelling systems, are here standardised with the Perfected Spelling System now in use in Indonesia. English translations of titles are provided underneath the original ones; Raffel's translations have been used for those in his book, while literal translations are provided for the titles of other works. Untitled works are recorded with their first words in parentheses. Years given are in the Gregorian calendar; works written between 1942 and 1945 generally used the Japanese kōki (皇紀) calendar.


Poetry collections

Original poems

Translated poems

Original prose

Translated prose

Notes

Footnotes

Works cited

 
 

 
 
 

Bibliographies by writer
Indonesian writers
Bibliographies of Indonesian writers